James W. Hill (1791 – 1864) was an American farmer, lawyer, and politician. He served in the first session of the Michigan House of Representatives

Biography 

James Hill was born in Rhode Island in 1791. By 1820, he was living in Grafton, New York, and by 1830 in Orangeville, New York.

Hill was the first settler in what is now Freedom Township in Washtenaw County, Michigan, when he moved there in June 1831 and built the first house and barn and planted the first wheat field in the area.

In 1835, Hill was elected as a Democrat to the first session of the Michigan House of Representatives following the adoption of the state's constitution.

He taught school for several years and was a director of Miller's Bank of Washtenaw. He transferred operation of the farm to his son Hanson in 1844 and moved to Manchester, Michigan, where he practiced law. He sold his farm in 1855 and moved to Prescott, Wisconsin, but returned to Lenawee County, Michigan by 1864. He died there, in Clinton, in 1864.

Family 

Hill had a wife named Esther, and the couple at least three sons and four daughters; among the sons were two named Hanson and Lodmua.

Notes

References 
 
 
 

1791 births
1864 deaths
Democratic Party members of the Michigan House of Representatives
19th-century American politicians